The first season of Smallville, an American television series developed by Alfred Gough and Miles Millar, began airing on October 16, 2001, on The WB television network. The series recounts the early adventures of Kryptonian Clark Kent as he adjusts to his developing superpowers in the fictional town of Smallville, Kansas, during the years before he becomes Superman. The first season comprises 21 episodes and concluded its initial airing on May 21, 2002. Regular cast members during season one include Tom Welling, Kristin Kreuk, Michael Rosenbaum, Eric Johnson, Sam Jones III, Allison Mack, Annette O'Toole, and John Schneider.

The season's stories focus on Martha and Jonathan Kent's (O'Toole and Schneider) attempts to help their adopted son Clark (Welling) cope with his alien origin and control his developing superhuman abilities. Clark must deal with the meteor-infected individuals that begin appearing in Smallville, his love for Lana Lang (Kreuk), and not being able to tell his two best friends, Pete Ross (Jones III) and Chloe Sullivan (Mack), about his abilities or his origins. Clark also befriends Lex Luthor (Rosenbaum) after saving Lex's life. The season also follows Lex, as he tries to assert his independence from his father, Lionel Luthor (John Glover).

The episodes were filmed primarily in Vancouver and post-production work took place in Los Angeles. Gough and Millar assisted the writing staff with week-to-week story development. "Villain of the week" storylines were predominant during the first season; physical effects, make-up effects, and computer generated imagery became important components as well. Limited filming schedules sometimes forced guest actors to perform physical stunts, and the series regulars were more than willing to do stunt work. Episode budgets ultimately became strictly regulated, as the show frequently ran over budget during the first half of the season. The pilot broke The WB's viewership record for a debut series, and was nominated for various awards. Although the villain of the week storylines became a concern for producers, critical reception was generally favorable, and the series was noted as having a promising start. The first season was released on DVD on September 23, 2003, and included various special features that focused on individual episodes and the series as a whole. It has also been released on home media in regions 2 and 4 in the international markets.

Episodes

Production

Writing 
Ground rules for story development were established at the outset. Part of the marketing pitch, "no flights, no tights" dictated that Clark would not wear the Superman costume, nor would he fly. After initial discussion of possible storylines, a second rule decreed that Clark could never directly kill anyone. This created a dilemma since Clark must be able to defeat the "bad guys" from week to week. A solution developed in later episodes with the introduction of the Belle Reve sanitarium (Belle Reve is a Federal prison for metahumans and other supervillains in the comics).

After setting the ground rules, Gough and Millar conceived ideas that facilitated week-to-week story development. For example, kryptonite's role was expanded to include enhancement of the sins of the antagonist: instead of creating physical monsters, exposure to kryptonite would amplify their personal demons. This was not treated as literally in the pilot and "Metamorphosis" as it was in later episodes. In "Cool", it was "the 'cool' kid literally [becoming] cool, needing human body heat to stay alive". After several episodes, the writers developed a story that would help establish the show as more than a "villain of the week" series. The ninth episode ("Rogue"), which took longer than usual to develop due to its divergence from the standard formula, became their first "true crime story" and demonstrated that Smallville could include more than kryptonite-powered villains.

"What if" episodes were another Millar-Gough concept used to generate first season storylines. These episodes posed underlying questions about Clark. Episodes would evolve from basic questions, including: "what if someone had a crush on Lana, and acted on that obsession"; "what if someone found out Clark's secret"; "what if someone else had Clark's powers?" These three questions developed into the episodes "Metamorphosis", "Rogue", and "Leech", respectively. "Stray", episode 16, answered the question, "what if Clark had been adopted by the wrong parents and his powers were exploited?" "X-Ray" director Mark Verheiden and the rest of the crew realized divergent, unrelated storylines were not the best way to create episodes for Smallville. Verheiden believes "X-Ray" was the first episode that managed to bring all the side-stories together so that they affected characters other than Clark and Lana.

"Hourglass" was one of the stories included in Millar and Gough's initial pitch to the network (at the time it was referred to as "Cassandra"). "Hourglass" was the first episode to present two, distinct stories: the vengeful serial killer and the second sighted Cassandra. Two significant storylines in the same episode forced the writers to spend more time developing the episode. Cassandra's "visceral vision" (as it was referred to in the script) of Lex's future was developed into color storyboards to better illustrate to the filmmakers the "blood rain" described in the text.

When the filmmakers were dissatisfied with the initial drafts of episodes, specifically with the evolution of characters, they would rewrite events, or add scenes to re-establish the original vision. The character of Earl Jenkins (Tony Todd), intended to be a sympathetic villain, came across as "completely unlikable" in the original draft of "Jitters". The character suffers from over-exposure to kryptonite, causing massive seizures; if Jenkins happened to grab someone, they could be shaken to death. Originally, the character is first seen banging on the door of LuthorCorp and killing a security guard during one of his seizures. To present a more favorable aspect to the audience, a scene in which Earl visits his infant child was added to show that he was not a "raving maniac". Similar rewrites occurred with the characters Ryan James (Ryan Kelley) in "Stray" and Tyler Randall (Reynaldo Rosales) in "Reaper". In the original draft of "Stray", Ryan developed his telepathic abilities from exposure to kryptonite.; to emphasize the show was not always about kryptonite-infected villains, the story was revised so that Ryan had his ability from birth. The network also expressed dissatisfaction with Ryan as a murderer, so the character was rewritten to be the "nice kid". The character of Tyler Randall shared Earl Jenkins's issue: he was not sympathetic enough in the filmmakers' eyes; intended to be an escaped prisoner, he was rewritten to be "the world's deadliest nice guy".

Filming 
Production was set up in Vancouver, British Columbia, Canada, because the creators were looking for a "Middle America landscape", and Vancouver was a good substitute for Kansas. David Nutter, the director of the pilot, was given 16 days for main unit filming, twice that of the normal timeframe. Despite the extended schedule, it was still a short amount of time, and he shot the pilot primarily from storyboards created by Adrien Van Viersen.

Millar developed most of the look for Smallville with the idea that Smallville should be the epitome of "Smalltown, USA". Millar's design required existing buildings to be painted, built, and remodeled. The Kent farm is the home of the Andalini family, and their barn was used for the pilot before a new barn was built. The new barn was one of the major additions to the sets of the episode "Metamorphosis". Production designer Doug Higgins and his crew built a fully functioning, three-story barn for the Kent farm on a converted soundstage in Burnaby. For the pilot, the crew built only a loft, with a set of stairs leading up to it, inside the existing barn on the Andalinis' property. To resemble the Andalinis' barn as closely as possible, Higgins had his crew locate 100-year-old wood to match the look of the Andalinis' barn. The episode "Hourglass" called for several scenes to take place at the White House. Instead of building their own set, the Smallville producers called John Wells, producer of the political drama television series The West Wing, and obtained permission to use the West Wing set to film the vision of Lex's future.

When the Smallville crew was not filming on one of the constructed sets, or on a sound stage, they were shooting on location at the surrounding Vancouver sites. During the filming of "Metamorphosis", Vancouver was holding a farmers' market, which proved beneficial to the Smallville crew, as "Metamorphosis" called for a similar event to take place in the episode. The market was on the verge of ending, so the filmmakers shot what wide-angle scenes they could at the time, and filmed a close up conversation between Whitney and Clark at the Andalini's farm, weeks after the initial market shooting. Other filming locations include Vancouver's Pacific National Exhibition and Burnaby's Swangard Stadium. The Pacific National Exhibit provided a storage silo for a scene in "Hourglass", which involved Harry Bollston (Eric Christian Olsen) attacking Martha Kent (O'Toole) in the Kents' corn silo. "Hothead" director Greg Beeman, who had previously worked with Gough and Millar on The Strip and Martial Law, used Swangard Stadium, as a substitution for Smallville High Stadium, for the opening football scene that took place at night.

When filming fell behind schedule, another director came in to assist the main unit director in finishing the episode. Greg Beeman assisted director Chris Long for the two "visceral visions of the future" that appeared in the episode "Hourglass". "Jitters" was an episode with so many changes that its initial scheduling as the second episode of the season was pushed back to the eighth spot. By the time filming for "Jitters" was completed, three directors had worked on the project: Greg Beeman, Phil Sgriccia, and Michael Watkins; however, Watkins was given sole directing credit for the episode.

Effects 
A big part of the Smallville series relies on the effects it delivers, whether digital, physical, or special make-up effects. The effects shots, part of the post-production work, are developed and added in Los Angeles. David Nutter hired Thomas Special Effects to create digital cornfields for the pilot episode. After attempting to grow ten thousand stalks of corn in a greenhouse, which only grew two feet tall, Nutter was forced to rely primarily on digital corn. Faux corn was also flown in from Arizona. CGI supervisor Bill Millar created digital butterflies for a scene in Lana's bedroom, and all the insects Greg Arkin (Chad Donella) collected in the episode "Metamorphosis". Greg's insects had to be created digitally, because a green hue was needed to illustrate the kryptonite radiation in the insects. After the opening credits, the first person view of someone, later revealed to be Clark, flying through Lana's open window and into her bedroom was created digitally. The effect was accomplished with stock footage, a sound stage and computer generated imagery. Stock footage shot from a helicopter, as it flew over several farms during the day, was used for the first person point of view. It was altered from day to night, and a CGI house was created in an empty field. Lana's bedroom as built on a soundstage, and CGI was used to create the illusion of someone traveling through her open window and stopping above her bed.

It was decided the effects of kryptonite poisoning on Clark, "Clark time", and the appearance of kryptonite when in the proximity of Clark would need to be illustrated in a way the audience could understand if they were not familiar with the character. Gough and Millar, after doing some research, learned the female audience was not aware of what was happening when Clark was exposed to kryptonite. Beginning with "Metamorphosis", whenever Clark was exposed to kryptonite, his veins would rise up and develop a green hue to illustrate the effect it was having. Close-up shots of Clark's hand were used for these scenes, and it was all created with digital animation. Gough and Millar developed the idea that kryptonite would only glow when it was around Clark, as it was meant to demonstrate the draining of his powers. "Clark time", the same idea behind bullet time, was created because previous incarnations had not explained the idea of what the world appears like to Clark when he is using his powers. The first instance of "Clark time" was used in the "Metamorphosis" scene where Greg Arkin attacks Clark and Jonathan in their barn. Jonathan is pushed over a banister and falls in the direction of some dangerous farm equipment. The effect involved slowing time down for everything except Clark, who would be moving at normal pace. When tackling Clark's emerging power of X-ray vision, Gough and Millar wanted to be able to see skeletons and bones, as opposed to previous incarnations that treated the ability like "see-through" vision. The recent advances in computer imagery helped them complete that task.

The digital effects costs for each episode could stretch the budget thin. In "Shimmer", Bill Millar, special effects supervisor, planned to create an artificial sunset for the closing scene involving Clark and Lana. The effects shot was supposed to last only a couple of seconds. James Marshall, the second unit director for the episode, decided to shoot the entire scene over the shoulders of Clark and Lana, looking at the sunset. The scene called for two greenscreen shots, but when Marshall was finished he had created seventeen greenscreen shots. The seventeen shots, which produced the artificial sunset, cost $50,000 to produce. By comparison, the entire effects budget costs between $65,000 and $100,000.

Over-spending of that nature became a regular occurrence on the Smallville set. The regularity of over-spending came to an end with "Kinetic", as the studio decided to be stricter. With the budget on a stiffer guideline, the filmmakers were forced to cut scenes from "Kinetic", an episode that was caught in the push for more budget-friendly scripts. One of the scenes that was cut involved one of the thieves phasing through a safe wall, and acting as a portal for the merchandise to be passed through. When digital effects were not an option, Mike Walls, the physical effects supervisor who began his Smallville career with "Leech", still tried to provide big effects. For instance, Walls used 75 cars for the final action scene of "Kinetic", which were cabled off to protect the actors. Stunt coordinator Lauro Chartrand attempts to make sure the actors are used as much as possible when performing fight scenes, unless the scenes are particularly dangerous. The fast shooting schedule forces Chartrand to rely on guest stars who can perform their own stunts, because of the limited time to find a "good double" for the actor.

Physical effects were not an issue for the series regulars. For "Nicodemus", the stunt coordinator received twice the help. Kristin Kreuk was expected to go to the tenth rung of a water tower, in a scene which involved her character climbing to the top and falling off. As filming progressed, Kreuk climbed to the top, so the crew cabled her off and dropped her  to the bottom. John Schneider's experience from The Dukes of Hazzard led to him performing the stunt driving for his character. The scene required Schneider to slide his truck around a corner, while yelling at some pedestrians on the sidewalk. The previous scene had established the driver side window as closed, so Schneider improvised and opened the driver's door as he slid 90° around a corner.

Reception 
The series' pilot broke The WB's record for highest-rated debut with 8.35 million viewers, 3.8/9 in the 18-49 demographic, 4.5/12 in the 18–34 demographic and beat its lead-in Gilmore Girls, which was viewed by 5.99 million viewers, 2.4/6 in the 18-49 demographic, 2.8/8 in the 18-34 demographic by 39.4%, 58.3%, 60.7% respectively. In the 18–34 male demographic, its 5.0 rating nearly tripled its lead-in (1.7). After airing the first two episodes, which averaged 7.8 million viewers, the WB placed an order for a full season of 21 episodes. The first season averaged 5.9 million viewers weekly, placing #115 in the Nielsen ratings alongside Futurama, The Ellen Show, and Star Trek: Enterprise. The pilot and "Tempest" were selected in The Futon Critic's 50 best episodes of 2001 and 2002, respectively. The pilot placed 31st, while "Tempest" placed 15th.

Often, the show would beat its lead-in, Gilmore Girls (which saw a 60% surge in its new timeslot) in the ratings. Towards the end of the season, it was #1 with viewers under 35 in the ratings, which beat Frasier, Scrubs, and 24.

The season received mostly favorable reviews. IGNs Jeremy Conrad, who was initially against the idea of "reimagining" the Superman mythology, gave the first season a 7/10 rating. After reviewing the entire season, Conrad stated the first season of Smallville was "a solid start to what will be a great Superman TV series". Entertainment Weekly Bruce Fretts believes the series might appear "corny" on the surface, but actually shows "subversively witty spin on the comic-book myths". Clint Morris, founder of Moviehole.net, stated the series was "still finding its feet in season one", although, he commended the acting, citing specifically Michael Rosenbaum's "uncontrollably likeable Lex Luthor". The Free-Lance Star'''s Rob Hedelt commended the casting as well, comparing Welling's portrayal of a teenage Clark Kent to that of Christopher Reeve's portrayal in the films. Hedelt considered John Schneider and Annette O'Toole to be ideal picks for Jonathan and Martha Kent, but felt Allison Mack and Sam Jones III, important characters, were the weakest part of the ensemble. Judge Byun, of DVD Verdict, felt having Clark Kent and Lex Luthor start their relationship as best friends was a "brilliant concept" that moved the show past a "Dawson's Creek with super powers" tone the premise of the show suggested. Byun believes the first season had "solid writing and excellent performances", but is weakened by the freak of the week storylines that plagued the early episodes of the season; the season works best when the episodes focus on character development and not super powers.

Other critics were less enthusiastic about the season. Peter Bowes of BBC News felt the season was simply a "soap opera" with "pretty young people". Bowes believes the season suffered from the "sentimental boy-girl storyline", but that die-hard Superman fans would still be taken in by this incarnation of the character's early years. A common criticism for the first season was the use of "villain of the week" storylines. By the time the first seven episodes aired, at least one journalist had had enough of the villain of the week format. Pittsburgh Post-Gazette's Rob Owen wrote the series works best with its "character interaction and a nice performance by John Schneider as Pa Kent", but that the show needs more than the "'monster of the week' stories seen so far". Jordan Levin, president of The WB's Entertainment division, recognized the concerns that the show had become a villain of the week series. Levin announced that season two would see more "smaller mini-arcs over three to four episodes, to get away from some of the formulaic storytelling structure" the series has fallen into.

 Awards 
By 2003, the first season had been nominated for and won various awards. It won an Emmy Award for "Outstanding Sound Editing for a Series", and the pilot episode was nominated for "Outstanding Visual Effects for a Series". The pilot was recognized by other award organizations, receiving a Leo Award for "Best Visual Effects" in 2002. Peter Wunstorf was recognized for his work on the pilot with a nomination by the American Society of Cinematographers. Casting directors Deedee Bradley, Coreen Mayrs, and Barbara Miller were nominated for an Artios Award for their work on the pilot. Chris McGeary was nominated for Golden Reel's "Best Sound Editing in Television" award for his music editing on the pilot. The season one finale, "Tempest", was nominated for Golden Reel's "Best Sound Editing in Television Episodic" in 2003. In 2002, The American Society of Composers, Authors, and Publishers honored the band Remy Zero (which provided the opening theme song for Smallville) and composer Mark Snow for their contributions to the show; the award recognized the composers of the theme or underscore of the highest rated television series during January 1 – December 31, 2001.

Several members of the regular cast were nominated for awards. In 2001, Rosenbaum, Kreuk, and Welling were nominated for Saturn Awards for Best Supporting Actor in a Television Series, Best Actress, and Best Actor, respectively. Rosenbaum and Kreuk received additional nominations for male and female Cinescape Genre Face of the Future awards, and the entire season was nominated for Best Network Television Series. Rosenbaum was the only one to win an award (Best Supporting Actor). Tom Welling won the Teen Choice Award for Choice Breakout TV Star—Male in 2002. Smallville's first season placed sixth on the Parents Television Council's list of the "best shows for families".

 Home media release 
The complete first season of Smallville'' was released on September 23, 2003 in North America. Additional releases in regions 2 and 4 took place on October 13, 2003 and December 3, 2003, respectively. The DVD box set included various special features, including episode commentary, an interactive tour of Smallville, and storyboards from select episodes.

References

External links 

 
 
 List of Smallville season 1 guide at kryptonsite.com

1
2001 American television seasons
2002 American television seasons